Gillian Galbraith is an Advocate-turned-author, a Scottish crime writer, whose protagonist, DS Alice Rice, is based in Edinburgh.

Biography 
Gillian was born and brought up near Haddington, East Lothian. She practiced until 1999 as an advocate specialising in medical negligence cases. She was the legal correspondent for The Scottish Farmer and has written on legal matters for The Times. She lives in Kinrosshire with her husband Robert and daughter Daisy Galbraith (born 26/08/1999).

Bibliography

DS Alice Rice series 
 Blood in the Water (2007)
 Where the Shadow Falls (2008)
 Dying of the Light (2009)
 No Sorrow to Die (2010)
 The Road to Hell (2012)
 Troubled Waters (2014)

Father Vincent Ross series
 The Good Priest (2014)

Standalone
 The End of the Line (2019)

External links
Personal website
Gillian Galbraith

Alumni of the University of Dundee
Alumni of the University of Edinburgh
Living people
Scottish crime fiction writers
Year of birth missing (living people)
Scottish women novelists
Scottish journalists
Scottish women journalists
21st-century Scottish women writers
Women mystery writers